61 Medium Regiment is part of the Regiment of Artillery of the Indian Army.

Formation and history
The regiment was raised as 61 Field Regiment on 1 April 1962 at Mohamadi Lines, Golconda Fort, Hyderabad. The first commanding officer was Lieutenant Colonel RS Bawa. Following initial training, it was declared fit for operations on 31 March 1963. The regiment shed its S battery to 162 Field Regiment on its formation in 1963. The unit presently consists of 157, 158 and 159 batteries and has been converted to a medium regiment.

Operations
The regiment has taken part in the following operations –
Indo-Pakistani War of 1965
It was posted under 14 Infantry Division during the war. It took part in Operation Chawinda and lost one officer and one other ranks (OR) during the war.
Indo-Pakistani War of 1971 
The regiment took part in Operation Cactus Lily in the western front. It lost one OR during the war.
Other operations
Operation Trident : 1986-1987
Operation Meghdoot : 1989-1990
Operation Rakshak II (counter terrorist operations) : 1992-1994
Operation Vijay : 1999
Operation Rakshak : counter terrorist operations in Jammu and Kashmir, 2007-2009

Gallantry awards
The regiment has won the following gallantry awards –
Sena Medal – 4
Mentioned in dispatches – 2 
Chief of Army Staff Commendation cards – 1
Vice Chief of Army Staff Commendation cards – 1
General Officer Commanding in Chief Commendation cards – 12

War Cry
The war cry of the regiment is Velluvom, velluvom, vetrikonde selluvom, which translates to We will win and we will continue to win.

See also
List of artillery regiments of Indian Army

References

Military units and formations established in 1962
Artillery regiments of the Indian Army after 1947